Bonar Creek is a  long 1st order tributary to Dutch Fork in Washington County, Pennsylvania.  This is the only stream of this name in the United States.  There is a stream, called Bonar Creek, in the Province of Ontario.

Variant names
According to the Geographic Names Information System, it has also been known historically as:
Dutch Fork

Course
Bonar Creek rises about 3 miles southwest of Claysville, Pennsylvania, in Washington County and then flows northwest to join Dutch Fork at Coon Island.

Watershed
Bonar Creek drains  of area, receives about 40.7 in/year of precipitation, has a wetness index of 299.33, and is about 62% forested.

See also
List of Pennsylvania Rivers

References

Rivers of Pennsylvania
Rivers of Washington County, Pennsylvania